Paula Fakavainga Kinikinilau (born on the 30 August 1986) is a Tongan-born Romanian rugby union footballer. A centre, he is currently playing for RC Timişoara in the Romanian Rugby Championship. He played for the Otago ITM Cup team in the New Zealand Domestic competition in 2010. He also played in Singapore for the Penguins and in Hong Kong.

He made his international debut in 2015 during a Rugby World Cup warm-up match for Romania against Tonga. He played in the 2015 Rugby World Cup.

References

1986 births
Living people
People from Haʻapai
Tongan rugby union players
Otago rugby union players
București Wolves players
CSA Steaua București (rugby union) players
SCM Rugby Timișoara players
Rugby union wings
Tongan expatriate rugby union players
Expatriate rugby union players in Singapore
Expatriate rugby union players in Romania
Expatriate rugby union players in Hong Kong
Tongan expatriate sportspeople in Hong Kong
Tongan expatriate sportspeople in Singapore
Tongan expatriate sportspeople in Romania
Romania international rugby union players